Khary Pierre (born 22 September 1991) is a Trinidadian cricketer. He made his international debut for the West Indies cricket team in November 2018, becoming the fourth youngest Trinidadian cricketer to make their debut for the West Indies along with Jayden Seales, Nicholas Pooran and Akeal Hosein

Domestic career
He made his first-class debut for Trinidad and Tobago in the 2016–17 Regional Four Day Competition on 25 November 2016. He made his List A debut for Trinidad and Tobago in the 2016–17 Regional Super50 on 31 January 2017. He made his Twenty20 debut for Trinbago Knight Riders in the 2017 Caribbean Premier League on 4 August 2017.

In June 2018, he was named in the Cricket West Indies B Team squad for the inaugural edition of the Global T20 Canada tournament. In July 2020, he was named in the Trinbago Knight Riders squad for the 2020 Caribbean Premier League.

International career
In October 2018, he was named in the West Indies' Twenty20 International (T20I) squad for series against India. He made his T20I debut for the West Indies against India on 4 November 2018. In May 2019, Cricket West Indies (CWI) named him as one of ten reserve players in the West Indies' squad for the 2019 Cricket World Cup.

In November 2019, he was named in the West Indies' One Day International (ODI) squad for the series against India. He made his ODI debut for the West Indies against India on 18 December 2019.

References

External links
 

1991 births
Living people
West Indies One Day International cricketers
West Indies Twenty20 International cricketers
Trinidad and Tobago cricketers
Trinbago Knight Riders cricketers
Place of birth missing (living people)